Attilio Bravi (9 September 1936 – 27 November 2013) was an Italian long jumper.

Biography
Born in Bra, Piedmont, Bravi competed in the 1960 Summer Olympics, Rome and had 16 caps in national team from 1954 to 1960.

Bravi died on 27 November 2013, aged 77, in his hometown of Bra, Piedmont.

Olympic results

National titles
Attilio Bravi has won 8 times the individual national championship.
8 wins in long jump (1952, 1954, 1955, 1956, 1957, 1958, 1959, 1960)

References

External links
 

1936 births
2013 deaths
People from Bra, Piedmont
Italian male long jumpers
Olympic athletes of Italy
Athletes (track and field) at the 1960 Summer Olympics
Athletics competitors of Fiamme Oro
Universiade medalists in athletics (track and field)
Universiade gold medalists for Italy
Medalists at the 1959 Summer Universiade
Sportspeople from the Province of Cuneo